Ajami is the Arabic adjective applied to an Ajam, a Persian or (relative to Arabic speakers) alien.

Ajami  may also refer to: 
 Ajami Nakhchivani, a Muslim architect from Azerbaijan and founder of the Nakhchivan school of architecture
 Ajami (surname)
 Ajami (film), a 2009 film
 Ajami, Iran (disambiguation), villages in Iran
 Ajami, Jaffa, a neighborhood in Israel
 Ajami dialect, a dialect of Persian
 Ajami script, one of the Arabic-based orthographies used for writing African languages
 Ajami Turkic
 Ajami Iraq

See also
Ajam (disambiguation)